The Yamaha WR250F is an off-road motorcycle made by Yamaha Motor Company. It has a  liquid-cooled single nikasil coated cylinder engine.  First offered in 2001, it shared many components and design concepts with the YZ250F motocross model. It is basically the YZ250F detuned slightly for more controllable power, with a headlight and lighting coil, softer suspension, a kickstand, better noise specifications, larger radiators, and lower emissions. The WR250F is basically a YZ250F modified for enduro competitions, extreme enduro competitions and hard enduro competitions and the practice of these extreme sports.   The WR in the name indicates a wide-ratio gear box common to most enduro or trail bikes and stands in contrast to the close-ratio gearbox essential to a motocross racer. Over the years the WR250F has benefited from the advances made in the YZ motocross version gaining advancements such as an aluminum frame and improved suspension.

Despite the similar name, it shares very few common components with the heavier, street-legal dual sport dirt oriented WR250R  or its sister supermoto build WR250X.

Significant advances

See also 
 Yamaha WR250R
 Yamaha WR450F
 Yamaha YZ250F

References 
 

WR250R
Off-road motorcycles
Motorcycles introduced in 2001